Benjamin James Davies (born 27 May 1981) is a Welsh football coach and former professional player who is a first-team coach at  club Grimsby Town.

As a player he was as a right back and midfielder playing between 2000 and 2021. Born in Birmingham, he began his career with Walsall before dropping into the Football Conference, playing for Kidderminster Harriers and Chester City. Moving back to the Football League he had spells with Shrewsbury Town, Notts County and Derby County before signing for Sheffield United, Portsmouth and Grimsby Town His career continued in non-league with a spells at Boston United and Cleethorpes Town. In 2019 he returned to Grimsby as a coach and briefly registered as a player again during 2020–21 season.

Career

Early career
Davies began his career with the youth system at Stoke City aged fifteen. He then joined Walsall in 1999 as part of their youth team. He had spells with Kidderminster Harriers and Chester City, where he won a Football Conference championship medal in 2004. During his time at the Deva, he was made club captain.

Shrewsbury Town
Davies joined Shrewsbury Town two days before turning 25, making his club debut in the 2006–07 opener against Mansfield Town, which finished 2–2. He scored in Shrewsbury's next three matches, going on to net a total of 12 times over the course of the season.

After Davies helped Shrewsbury to seventh position in the league, he suffered an injury in the play-off semi-final against MK Dons, which meant that he missed the 2007 Football League Two play-off Final, and was expected miss to the first half of the 2007–08 season. Davies recovered faster than expected from his Achilles tendon injury, returning for the first team in late November. He played an instrumental role in Shrewsbury's return to winning ways, scoring a stunning free kick and an excellent driven goal in a 4–0 win against Dagenham and Redbridge and also scoring away against Accrington Stanley. Following Stewart Drummond's departure in the January 2008 transfer window, Davies was installed as Shrewsbury's club captain.

He underwent a double hernia operation in November 2008, which kept him out for a month. Having missed the 2007 final, Davies played the 2009 League Two play-off final, which Shrewsbury lost. One of several key players out of contract at the end of the season, Shrewsbury did offer Davies a contract extension, however, Notts County offered him a deal which he felt gave him a greater chance at achieving his ambition to play at a higher level. As a result, Davies left Shrewsbury to join County.

Notts County
Davies had a successful first season at League Two club Notts County during their 2009–10 campaign, playing an integral part in them winning the league. He became the highest scoring midfielder in a single season in County's history as he scored 16 goals, alongside 20 assists, and won several awards, including Supporters player of the year, club player of the year and goal of the season, as well as being named in the PFA Team of the year.

His form was such that in August 2010 he was subject to overtures from Championship club Derby County, with Derby boss Nigel Clough leaving a 2–1 defeat at Coventry City 5 minutes early left to watch the player. Davies remained at County however, and in his first season at League One level hit 5 goals in 22 games, including two strikes in a 3–2 victory at Peterborough United, as well as numerous assist. The form saw Derby retain their interest into the January 2011 transfer window, lodging several bids which were rejected, Davies desire to play Championship football saw him hand in a transfer request, despite proclaiming "I absolutely love it here, I'm the happiest I have ever been in my career." Finally, a bid from Derby in the region of £350k was accepted by County and the player completed a move on 20 January 2011, signing a -year deal to run until July 2013.

Derby County
Davies made his full Derby County debut on 22 January 2011 in a 1–0 home defeat to fierce rivals Nottingham Forest. Joining the club in a run of form which had seen just one win from their previous nine fixtures, Davies had to wait until his seventh appearance before tasting a victory at his new club; a 1–0 victory at relegation rivals Sheffield United. As the club itself struggled, so did Davies with the step up and, after starting in a 3–1 home defeat to Doncaster Rovers, Davies was dropped to the bench. Davies later admitted that he deserved to be dropped; "I'm not one to hide and my performances weren't good enough – I know that. I hold my hands up. I couldn't go knocking the manager's door down saying I deserved to be in the team because, based on my performances, I didn't." Davies was eventually recalled to the starting line-up in April 2011, hitting the winner in a 2–1 victory over Leeds United, with an "unstoppable" 20-yard volley. Despite this, Davies was unable to hold down a regular place for the remainder of the season.

After playing an active role in Derby's pre-season fixtures, Davies found himself in the first team for the start of the 2011–12 season, playing every minute as Derby won their opening four fixtures for the first time in 106-years to find themselves in 2nd place in the early season table. The fourth victory, 3–0 over Doncaster Rovers, saw Davies open his account for the season as well as provide assists for the other two goals. Davies was rewarded with a place in the Championship Team of the Week, something he repeated following his performance in a 3–0 win over Millwall, a game in which he created two of Derby's three goals. The form of Davies dropped during November he was dropped from the starting 11 at the start of December, making only three substitute appearances until the start of March 2012, making an immediate impact as he set up a headed goal for Steve Davies within 2 minutes of coming on. With Davies restored to the starting eleven, Derby manager Nigel Clough urged Davies take advantage of the injury of Jamie Ward, stating the quality Davies can offer from set pieces and crosses. Davies was eventually credited with 11 assists during the 2011–12 season, 10 in the league and 1 in the League Cup.

In 2012–13, Davies lost his place as a regular member of the matchday squad and was restricted to limited substitute appearances and games as an overage player in Derby's under-21 team. Despite this Davies scored his first goal in 15 months in a 3–1 win against Leeds United Davies scoring in the stoppage time after being introduced in the 82nd minute of the game. Davies hoped this goal help regain his place in starting line up at Derby after he turned down several loan moves due to personal issues after his ten-month-old son Evan had health issues and had an eye operation. Davies began to feature more regularly for County after the turn of the year, and after impressing manager Nigel Clough with his performances in March and April, Davies was offered a new one-year contract at the end of April.

2013–14 saw Davies restricted to the League Cup and two substitute appearances in the opening stages of the season. After the sacking of Nigel Clough at the end of September, Davies appeared just twice more as a substitute and following an 89th-minute substitute in a 3–0 win over Sheffield Wednesday on 9 November 2013 he disappeared from the first team picture completely.

Sheffield United
Davies eventually linked up with former manager Clough in February 2014 when he signed for Sheffield United on loan until the end of the season. With United struggling with injuries, Davies was initially employed as a left-back and scored his first goal for the club from a free kick in a 2–0 home victory over Peterborough United at the start of March. Davies played regularly for United for the remainder of the season, appearing in a number of positions, and finished the campaign having made 20 appearances for the Blades and scored three goals. With his deal at Derby due to expire, United offered Davies a permanent contract in the summer of 2014, a deal which he duly signed the following month.

Davies was released when his contract expired at the end of the 2014–15 season.

Portsmouth
Following a pre-season trial Davies signed a one-year deal with Portsmouth on 6 August 2015. He scored his first goal for Portsmouth in a 6–0 win over York City on 24 November 2015. His consistent performances led to Davies being awarded six different player-of-the-season trophies from supporter groups, the biggest haul of any player and finished runner-up to Michael Doyle who won The News/Sports Mail Player of the Season award.

Davies left Portsmouth come the end of the 2015–16 season, this was due to both parties failing to agree terms, However he was keen for a two-year contract and an increase in salary.

Grimsby Town
On 29 June 2016, Davies signed a one-year contract with newly promoted League Two club Grimsby Town on a free transfer. He scored on his debut against Morecambe F.C. on Saturday 6 August 2016 with a free-kick to seal Grimsby's 2–0 win. Davies picked up a calf injury on 8 October 2008 in a 0–0 draw at Exeter City, this led to a two-month spell on the sidelines.

Following the end of 2016–17, during which he made 25 league appearances and scored one goal, Davies agreed a new one-year contract. Davies turned down offers from other clubs down south to stay at Grimsby. He was released by Grimsby at the end of the 2017–18 season.

Boston United
On 24 August 2018, Davies joined National League North club Boston United.

Cleethorpes Town
On 20 July 2019 it was confirmed that Davies had joined Cleethorpes Town.

Coaching career
On 18 November 2019, Grimsby Town announced that Davies would be assisting interim manager, Anthony Limbrick and Dave Moore on a temporary basis. Davies already worked for the club as an academy coach alongside his playing career at Cleethorpes Town. Davies eventually returned to Grimsby permanently and became First Team coach and U23 Manager under new manager Ian Holloway. In January 2020, Holloway hinted that Davies would be offered a playing contract as well, although this wasn't made official until he was handed a squad number for the start of the 2020–21 season.

Davies was placed in temporary charge of the Mariners when Ian Holloway resigned his position on 23 December 2020. In his managerial debut, Grimsby were beaten 3–1 at Morecambe. In his second and final game as caretaker manager on 29 December 2020, The Mariners drew 0–0 with Oldham Athletic. Davies reverted to his previous coaching role the following day as Grimsby appointed Paul Hurst as the new first team manager.

Personal life
Born in Birmingham, Davies supported Aston Villa as a child.

Career statistics

Club

Honours
Chester City
Football Conference: 2003–04

Notts County
Football League Two: 2009–10

Individual
League Two PFA Team of the Year: 2008–09 2009–10
Goal of the Year: 2009–10 against Bury (3 April 2010)
Club Player of the Year: 2009–10
Supporters Player of the Year: 2009–10
Player of the Month: 2009–10

References

External links

Ben Davies profile at the Grimsby Town F.C. website

1981 births
Living people
Footballers from Birmingham, West Midlands
English footballers
Association football midfielders
Walsall F.C. players
Kidderminster Harriers F.C. players
Chester City F.C. players
Shrewsbury Town F.C. players
Notts County F.C. players
Derby County F.C. players
Sheffield United F.C. players
Portsmouth F.C. players
Grimsby Town F.C. players
Boston United F.C. players
Cleethorpes Town F.C. players
English Football League players
National League (English football) players
English football managers
Grimsby Town F.C. managers
Association football coaches
Grimsby Town F.C. non-playing staff